Sherri may refer to:

Sherri (name)
Sherri (2009 TV series), an American sitcom starring Sherri Shepherd
Sherri (talk show), a syndicated daytime show hosted by Sherri Shepherd that premiered in 2022

See also
 Shari (disambiguation)
 Sheri
 Sherie
 Sherrie
 Sherry (disambiguation)
 Shery